Donòri is a comune (municipality) in the Province of South Sardinia in the Italian region Sardinia, located about  north of Cagliari.

Donòri borders the following municipalities: Barrali, Samatzai, Sant'Andrea Frius, Serdiana, Ussana.

Demographic evolution

References 

Cities and towns in Sardinia